Olymp-K ( meaning Olympus) is a Russian geostationary satellite built for the Russian Ministry of Defence and Federal Security Service (FSB).  The satellite is also referred to as "Luch". It is believed to be a signals intelligence satellite.

Launch
Olymp-K was launched on 28 September 2014. The Proton-M rocket with a Briz-M upper stage launched from Baikonur Cosmodrome launchpad 81/24 in Kazakhstan at 20:23 UTC. After four burns of the Briz-M upper stage it was placed into geosynchronous transfer orbit. In a press release on 28 September 2014, Roscosmos referred to the satellite as "Luch".

Manoeuvres
Following its launch, the Olymp-K satellite made several manoeuvres before settling at 18.1° West longitude around 4 April 2015. The satellite was then positioned in an orbit directly between Intelsat 901, which was located at 18° West, and Intelsat 7, located at 18.2° West. It remained in geosynchronous orbit between the satellites for five months. At times, Olymp-K performed colocation manoeuvres, positioning itself around 10 kilometres from the satellites. In September 2015, the satellite was manoeuvred to a position at 24.4° West, adjacent to the Intelsat 905 satellite. While JFCC SPACE spokesperson and Air Force Captain Nicholas Mercurio said there were three occasions where the Olymp-K satellite had come within five kilometres of another satellite, an industry source indicated that Air Force data were predictions based on drift rates and that Olymp-K's approach had not brought it closer than 10 kilometres to the Intelsat satellites.  As of December 2019, the satellite is located at 70.6° East Longitude.

In 2018, France criticised Russia for manoeuvring the satellite close to the French Athena-Fidus satellite. Florence Parly, the French defence minister, accused Russia of "an act of espionage".

Analysis and response
Intelsat criticized the maneouvres, with Intelsat General president Kay Sears saying that "this is not normal behavior and we're concerned." Attempts by Intelsat to contact the owners of the Russian satellite directly and via the US Defense Department did not receive a response. Members of the space community consider the incident to be among the first documented instances of a foreign military satellite approaching a commercial operator in such a manner.

In a 5 October analysis of Russian proximity and rendezvous operations written for the Space Review, Secure World Foundation technical adviser Brian Weeden highlighted Olymp-K's movements. In his paper, he wrote that many Russian space program observers believe the satellite mission involves signals intelligence or communications. Observers also speculated whether there is a connection between Olymp-K and the Yenisey A1 (Luch 4) experimental satellite. A Kommersant report indicated that Olymp-K would provide secure governmental communications as well as electronic intelligence (SIGINT). Sources have also reported that the satellite has an onboard laser communications device and will provide the GLONASS system with navigation correction signals.

Olymp-K's maneouvres were reported to have led to several classified meetings within the U.S. Defense Department.

See also

Kosmos 2499

References

Spacecraft launched by Proton rockets
Spacecraft launched in 2014
Satellites using the Ekspress bus
Military satellites of Russia
2014 in Russia